The National Company Law Tribunal is a quasi-judicial body in India that adjudicates issues relating to Indian companies. The tribunal was established under the Companies Act 2013 and was constituted on 1 June 2016 by the government of India and is based on the recommendation of the V. Balakrishna Eradi   committee on law relating to the insolvency and the winding up of companies.

All proceedings under the Companies Act, including proceedings relating to arbitration, compromise, arrangements,  reconstructions and the winding up of companies shall be disposed off by the National Company Law Tribunal. The NCLT bench is chaired by a Judicial member who is supposed to be a retired or a serving High Court Judge and a Technical member who must be from the Indian Corporate Law Service, ICLS Cadre.

The National Company Law Tribunal is the adjudicating authority for the insolvency resolution process of companies and limited liability partnerships under the Insolvency and Bankruptcy Code, 2016.

No criminal court shall have jurisdiction to entertain any suit or proceeding in respect of any matter which the Tribunal or the Appellate Tribunal is empowered to determine by or under this Act or any other law for the time being in force and no injunction shall be granted by any court or other authority in respect of any action taken or to be taken in pursuance of any power conferred by or under this Act or any other law for the time being in force, by the Tribunal or the Appellate Tribunal.

The tribunal has sixteen benches, six at New Delhi (one being the principal bench) and two at Ahmedabad, one at Prayagraj, one at Bengaluru, one at Chandigarh, two at Chennai, one at Cuttack, one at Guwahati, three at Hyderabad of which one is at Amaravati, one at Jaipur, one at Kochi, two at Kolkata and five at Mumbai. Of the two new benches approved to be set up, one each in Indore and Amaravati, the Indore bench is yet to be notified. Except the Bench at Amaravati, all the benches have been notified as division benches. Justice M.M. Kumar, a retired Chief Justice of the Jammu & Kashmir High Court has been appointed president of the tribunal.

The National Company Law Tribunal has the power under the Companies Act to adjudicate proceedings:

 Initiated before the Company Law Board under the previous act (the Companies Act 1956);
 Pending before the Board for Industrial and Financial Reconstruction, including those pending under the Sick Industrial Companies (Special Provisions) Act, 1985;
 Pending before the Appellate Authority for Industrial and Financial Reconstruction; and
 Pertaining to claims of oppression and mismanagement of a company, winding up of companies and all other powers prescribed under the Companies Act.

Appeals 
Decisions of the tribunal may be appealed to the National Company Law Appellate Tribunal, the decisions of which may further be appealed to the Supreme Court of India on a point of law. The Supreme Court of India has upheld the Insolvency and Bankruptcy Code in its entirety.

References

External links

 National Company Law Tribunal collected news and commentary at BloombergQuint

Indian company law
Indian Tribunals
Modi administration
2016 establishments in India
Courts and tribunals established in 2016